The Düsseldorf Marathon is an annual road marathon in Düsseldorf, Germany in early May, first held in 2003.

The generally flat course runs through parts of the city and alongside the banks of the Rhine.  The race day also includes other events, such as a marathon road relay, and over 10,000 people participate annually.

The race is a member of the Association of International Marathons and Distance Races (AIMS) and the  group. It is sponsored by Metro Group, a large international retailer based in the same city.

History 

Organised by Jan-Henning Winschermann (via rhein-marathon düsseldorf e.V.), the race was first held in 2003.

The men's course record was set at the 2013 race, when Dereje Debele won with a time of 2:07:48 hours, while the women's course record was set by Agnes Jeruto Barsosio in 2012, with a time of 2:25:49.

The 2020 edition of the race was cancelled due to the coronavirus pandemic, with entries automatically transferred to 2021 and registrants given the option of obtaining a refund.  Similarly, the 2021 edition of the race was postponed to 2022 due to the pandemic.

Course 

The marathon course lies entirely within the city, and is largely flat except for four bridge crossings.

The marathon then runs along the border of Altstadt and makes a small loop in Stadtmitte before heading eastward into Düsseltal. The course then runs roughly southwest back through Stadtmitte and then into Friedrichstadt and Unterbilk.

Winners 

Kenya has been the most successful nationality in the men's race. The women's race has seen mostly Germans top the podium.

Key: Course record (in bold)

Notes

References

External links
Official website

2003 establishments in Germany
Annual sporting events in Germany
Marathons in Germany
Recurring sporting events established in 2003
Marathon
Spring (season) events in Germany